Ernest Konon (born 16 March 1974 in Poland) is a Polish retired footballer.

Honours
Genk
Belgian Cup: 1997–98

References

Polish footballers
Association football forwards
Living people
1974 births
Jagiellonia Białystok players
K.R.C. Genk players
K.R.C. Zuid-West-Vlaanderen players
Zagłębie Lubin players
ŁKS Łódź players
Śląsk Wrocław players
Korona Kielce players